The Crosswicknung Trail was a Native American trail that became an important road connecting New Brunswick, New Jersey and Cranbury, New Jersey. It would later be known as Georges Road.

See also

 Assunpink Trail
 Deans, New Jersey

References

Pre-statehood history of New Jersey
Geography of Middlesex County, New Jersey
Native American history of New Jersey
Native American trails in the United States